Zarnegar may refer to:

Computing 
 Zarnegar (word processor)

Places
Zarnegar Park, in Afghanistan

People with the Surname 
Bijan Zarnegar (1940–2017), Iranian fencer
Esfandiar Zarnegar (born 1942), Iranian fencer
Shahpour Zarnegar (born 1929), Iranian fencer